The idea of a female president of the United States has been explored by various writers in novels (including science fiction), movies and television, as well as other media. Numerous actresses have portrayed a female president of the United States. Such portrayals have occurred in comedies as well as serious works. Fictional female acting presidents of the United States are not included in this article. In the 2020 presidential election, Kamala Harris became the first woman to be elected as Vice President of the United States and was inaugurated on January 20, 2021, becoming the first female vice president in American history. On November 19, 2021, President Joseph R. Biden underwent a colonoscopy, and temporarily transferred the powers of the presidency to then Vice President Kamala Harris as acting president, becoming the first woman to exercise presidential power.

Movies and television

These movies and television shows are American unless stated otherwise:

1920–1999
The 1924 silent science-fiction film The Last Man on Earth shows a woman as president of the United States; in the movie all adult men die of disease.
In the 1932 animated short Betty Boop for President, Betty Boop (voiced by Mae Questel) runs for and wins the presidency of the United States.
In the 1948 animated short Olive Oyl for President, a dream sequence shows Olive Oyl (voiced by Mae Questel) successfully running for president of the United States, after which she makes married men exempt from taxes in the hopes that Popeye will propose.
In Project Moonbase, a 1953 science-fiction film, Ernestine Barrier plays a female president of the United States.
In the 1964 comedy film Kisses for My President, Polly Bergen plays Leslie McCloud, the first female president of the United States. Leslie eventually discovers that she is pregnant, and resigns the presidency to devote herself full-time to her family.
In the 1985 ABC sitcom Hail to the Chief, Patty Duke plays the first female president of the United States. The show focused on President Julia Mansfield's attempt at balancing her political career with raising her family.
In the 1986 British satire film Whoops Apocalypse, Loretta Swit plays Barbara Adams, the first female president of the United States.
In the 1987 Australian film Les Patterson Saves the World, Joan Rivers plays the president of the United States.
In the pilot to the 1992 TV series X-Men, a female president of the United States is briefly shown.
In the 1995 episode "The Weaker Sex" of the TV series Sliders, Teresa Barnwell plays Hillary Clinton as president of the United States in an alternative universe where women are in charge.
In the 1996 comedy science fiction film Mars Attacks!, Natalie Portman plays the United States president's teenage daughter, who becomes the United States president herself after the government is destroyed by aliens.
In the 1998 comedy film Mafia!, Christina Applegate plays United States President Diane Steen. This character is a parody of Diane Keaton's character in the film series The Godfather, and she almost accomplishes world peace but is distracted by her boyfriend, a mobster.

2000–present
In the 2000 episode "Bart to the Future" of the FOX TV series The Simpsons, Bart looks thirty years into the future, at which time Lisa Simpson (voiced by Yeardley Smith) has become president of the United States after succeeding Donald Trump. In real life, Donald Trump became president of the United States in 2017, and left office in 2021. In the episode, Lisa states that she is "proud to be America's first straight female president," and it is implied that Chaz Bono, at the time still identifying as a lesbian, had previously been president. As well, in the 2021 episode of The Simpsons titled "Mother And Child Reunion", Werner Herzog predicts that Lisa Simpson will be president in the future, which the episode depicts.
In the 2000 episode "The Election" of the PBS TV series Arthur, Mary Alice ‘Muffy’ Crosswire (voiced by Melissa Altro) is shown to become president of the United States in the future.
In the 2001-2010 TV series 24, Cherry Jones plays the president of the United States. President Allison Taylor, whom she plays, takes office in the 2008 TV movie, 24: Redemption, and serves in Season 7 and Season 8. At the end of season 8 she resigns and goes to prison. She is the first female president of the United States, and though she is a Republican she is said to be based on Hillary Clinton.
In the 2001 American-Argentinian science-fiction film Perfect Lover, set in 2030, the world is run by women and Sally Champlin  plays the female president of the United States. The film begins with her saying, "I did not have sexual relations with that young man", similar to a real-life quote by president Bill Clinton.
In CBS's 2004 TV series Century City'''s fictional timeline, Oprah Winfrey is the president of the United States.
Towards the end of the 2004 film of Thunderbirds, Jeff Tracy answers a phone call from a "Madam President".
ABC's 2005-2006 TV series Commander in Chief focused on the fictional administration and family of Mackenzie Allen (played by Geena Davis), the first female president of the United States, who ascends to the post from the vice presidency after the death of the sitting president from a sudden cerebral aneurysm.
In the 2005-2009 FOX TV series Prison Break, Patricia Wettig plays vice President Caroline Reynolds, who becomes president of the United States after she arranges the assassination of the former president.
In the 2006 French miniseries L'État de Grace, Peggy Frankston plays Hillary Clinton, who is shown as the president of the United States in two episodes.
A 2006 BBC Four adaptation of John Wyndham's short story Random Quest depicts the main character being sucked into an alternative reality in which Condoleezza Rice is president of the United States.
In ABC's 2008-2009 TV series Life on Mars (a remake of BBC's series of the same name), it is hinted that Malia Obama, the daughter of then-candidate Barack Obama, is the president of the United States in 2035.
In Showtime's TV series Homeland, which began in 2011, Elizabeth Marvel plays United States President Elizabeth Keane. Elected in 2016, she was subject to two assassination attempts and a smear campaign by rogue elements of the US government, military and intelligence community due to her policies of curtailing the powers of the CIA. Following a GRU misinformation campaign to sow constitutional crisis in the United States, an exonerated Keane nonetheless resigns to perserve American democracy in the face of undermined public trust and deep political polarization.
In ABC's TV series Scandal, which began in 2012, Bellamy Young plays Melody Margaret Grant, who becomes the first female president of the United States after the assassination of President-elect Francisco Vargas on election night.
In the 2012 Finnish-German-Australian film Iron Sky, Stephanie Paul plays a female president of the United States as a Sarah Palin-esque parody.
In the 2011-2012 English-language Franco-Canadian TV series XIII: The Series, Sally Sheridan appears in two episodes. Mimi Kuzyk plays Sally Sheridan, who becomes the first female president of the United States, but is assassinated. Kuzyk previously appeared as United States President Sally Sheridan in the miniseries XIII: The Conspiracy, in which Sheridan is also assassinated.
In the HBO TV series Veep, which began in 2012, Julia Louis-Dreyfus plays vice President Selina Meyer, who becomes the 45th president of the United States after the sitting president resigns to look after his mentally ill wife. Her successor as United States president, Laura Montez, played by Andrea Savage, is also a woman, the running mate of opposition candidate Bill O'Brian. Meyer wins re-election in 2020 (albeit through Chinese election interference and a series of compromising acts at her party's brokered convention) and serves a single full term. At Meyer's funeral in 2045, a former successful two-term president, Kemi Talbot (a progressive rival to Meyer during the 2020 primaries and the brokered convention), played by Toks Olagundoye, delivers the main eulogy.
In the Netflix TV series House of Cards, which began in 2013 and ended in 2018, Robin Wright plays Claire Underwood, who becomes the United States president after the resignation of her husband Frank Underwood.
In the 2014-2019 CBS series Madam Secretary, Téa Leoni plays Elizabeth McCord, United States Secretary of State, who in the final season is shown to have won the presidential election after a flash forward from the previous season.
In the 2014-2015 NBC TV series State of Affairs, Alfre Woodard plays Constance Payton, the first black female president of the United States.
In the 2015 film Justice League: Gods and Monsters, Penny Johnson Jerald plays United States President Amanda Waller in an unspecified alternative universe.
In the 2015 Spanish animated adventure film Capture the Flag, there is a female president of the United States. In this film, she realizes the chaos brought by the conspiracy theories and disbelief of the first missions to the moon provoked by the evil industrialist Richard Carson, who plans to conquer the moon after denouncing the NASA Apollo 11 mission as a fake to the public. She orders NASA to once again go to the moon, before Carson, in order to rescue the historical flag planted on the moon to show the truth to the whole world.
In the TV series Supergirl, which began in 2015, Lynda Carter plays United States President Olivia Marsdin.
In the TV series Quantico, which began in 2015, Marcia Cross plays Claire Haas, who becomes president of the United States after the president steps down.
In the 2016 science-fiction film Independence Day: Resurgence, Sela Ward plays Elizabeth Lanford, the 45th and first female president of the United States, who is in her first term, succeeding Thomas J. Whitmore, William Grey, and Lucas Jacobs. She is eventually killed by the alien queen.
In a sketch in a 2016 episode of the Comedy Central TV series Inside Amy Schumer, Schumer plays United States President Schinton, who has her period on her first day as president, and does poorly because of it.
In the 2016 film The Purge: Election Year, Elizabeth Mitchell plays Senator Charlie Roan, who is elected president on the platform of ending the Annual Purge, after barely surviving the night herself. In The Forever Purge, she was mentioned as serving for two terms, after which the Purge is swiftly reinstated.
In the second season of the Swedish series Modus in 2017, Kim Cattrall plays President Helen Tyler, who disappears during a state visit to Sweden.
In the 2017 episode "21C" of the Netflix series Travelers, the Traveler team are tasked with protecting Anna Hamilton, a child in 2017 who will later go on to become the 53rd President of the United States in the future after an extremely close election. Grant MacLaren remarks that he believed the 53rd President was 'another old white guy' before being told that Hamilton's election is a side-effect of the changed timeline.
In the 2018 film Hunter Killer, Caroline Goodall plays United States President Ilene Dover.
In the series For All Mankind, which began in 2018, Jodi Balfour plays Ellen Wilson (née Waverly), an astronaut and member of "Nixon's Women" who becomes President of the United States after the 1992 election.
In the 2019 film Long Shot, Charlotte Field is sworn in as the first female president of the United States.
In a 2020 episode of the series The Good Fight, titled “The Gang Deals with Alternate Reality”, in an alternate reality Hillary Clinton has beaten Donald Trump in the 2016 United States presidential election and is now serving as the 45th President of the United States.
In the 2020 series Diary of a Future President, Gina Rodriguez plays President Elena Cañero-Reed, a Cuban-American who recounts her youth and path to the presidency after finding an old diary.
The 2020 film Superintelligence features a female president.
On the YouTube channel “Paulette Jones” there are two videos about her running for President; she only got one vote, from herself, in the 2020 election. 
In the episode "The Rad Awesome Terrific Ray" of the 2020 Hulu animated series Solar Opposites, former First Lady Michelle Obama is president in an alternate timeline.
In 2021, Netflix released the political satire, Don't Look Up, in which Meryl Streep plays the role of president serving as a comet approaches Earth, guaranteeing the end of the world if action is not taken.
In the 2021 series Y: The Last Man, Diane Lane plays Jennifer Brown, a congresswoman and Chair of the House Intelligence Committee who was elevated to President after the death of every mammal with a Y chromosome except for her son Yorick and his pet capuchin monkey Ampersand. With most of the line of succession dead, Brown became President one hour after being elected Speaker of the House, having to oversee government responses to failing infrastructure, rioting and shortages resulting from the die-off, as well as secretly authorising the covert resolution of the procreation crisis. Regina Oliver, the fringe-right Secretary of Veterans Affairs and the sole eligible member of the previous line of presidential succession, was presumed dead but was found alive in Israel; she effectively became President after Brown was removed from office for keeping Yorick's survival secret, but was killed during a raid on the Pentagon shortly after.

Music
In 2017, a song called "First Woman President", about a fictional first female president of the United States, was released; it is by the American musician Jonathan Mann. The song depicts the female president as having an all-female Cabinet and liberal policies (for example "paid family leave, for both Mom and Dad"), and the singer says it is easy to be proud of his country under her presidency.

In the 2017 music video for "Family Feud" (a song by Jay-Z), Irene Bedard plays a Co-President of the United States in the future.

The 2020 music video for Ariana Grande’s song "Positions" depicts Grande as the President of the United States.

Novels
Female presidents of the United States have often appeared in science-fiction novels. In the 1959 science-fiction novel Alas, Babylon by Pat Frank (the pen name of Harry Hart Frank) President Josephine Vannebuker-Brown, formerly the Secretary of Health, Education, and Welfare, becomes president of the United States because she was the only member of the line of succession to survive nuclear war; this novel was one of the first apocalyptic novels of the nuclear age and consistently ranks in Amazon.com's Top 20 Science Fiction Short Stories list (which groups together short story collections and novels). Other science-fiction novels which feature female presidents of the United States include K.A. Applegate’s 2001–2003 series Remnants, Arthur C. Clarke and Stephen Baxter’s 2005 Sunstorm and 2001 The Light of Other Days, Jack McDevitt’s 1998 Moonfall, Robert J. Sawyer’s 2013 Red Planet Blues, John Shirley's 1985–1990 cyberpunk Eclipse Trilogy of novels, Allen Steele's 2002–2011 Coyote series of novels, and Robert Anton Wilson’s 1979 Schrödinger's Cat Trilogy of novels.

There is also a female president of the United States in the non-science-fiction novels Shall We Tell the President? (1977) and The Prodigal Daughter (1982), both by Jeffrey Archer, First Hubby (1990), by Roy Blount Jr., and The Woman President (2016), by Erwin Hargrove; in The Prodigal Daughter, First Hubby, and The Woman President the female president obtains her position through the death of the former president. Archer got the inspiration for his female president character Florentyna Kane's political life and rise to the presidency in The Prodigal Daughter from the real-life elections of Golda Meir, Margaret Thatcher and Indira Gandhi. Shall We Tell the President? also by Archer, initially featured president Ted Kennedy, but following the success of The Prodigal Daughter and a previous book featuring Kane in earlier life, called Kane and Abel, the character was changed to president Kane in later editions. In the novel Rodham, published in May 2020, on January 20, 2017, Hillary Rodham is elected the first female president, with Terry McAuliffe as her vice president.

Stand-up comedy
Some American stand-up comedians, for example Ted Alexandro and Chaunté Wayans, have joked in their stand-up comedy about a fictional woman being president of the United States, and done an impression of such a woman.

Other
There is a female president of the United States in the 1939 science-fiction short story Greater Than Gods, by C.L. Moore.
In the 1985 National Lampoon article "Rose, Rose, There She Goes...Into the Bushes to Take Off Her Clothes", written by Shary Flenniken, Rose Ambrose becomes the vice president of the United States because she is having an affair with the president, and later becomes president of the United States herself after the former president dies of a heart attack while having sex, and is eventually shot and killed by several people, including the former first lady.
An ad campaign for Donna Karan in 1992 called "In Women We Trust" featured model Rosemary McGrotha as a female president of the United States.
In a 1993 Slovenian clothing commercial, Melanija Knavs (who would later become the First Lady in 2017 when she was called Melania Trump) plays the first female president of the United States on the day she is inaugurated; the character is meant to be president of the United States, although the European Union flag is mistakenly used in place of the American flag.
In the 2003 science-fiction comic book series Y: The Last Man, by Brian K. Vaughan, Pia Guerra, and José Marzán Jr., Secretary of Agriculture Margaret Valentine becomes president of the United States after a plague kills all the men; she later wins reelection because Oprah was not available.X-Men: The End is a 2004-2006 trilogy of miniseries published by Marvel Comics, detailing the last days of the X-Men and their adventures in an alternative future: in the X-Men: The End future, Kitty Pryde becomes the mayor of Chicago and then President of the United States. 
In the 2010 video game Vanquish, Elizabeth Winters is president of the United States. She is voiced by Lee Meriwether. In the game it is revealed that Winters has betrayed America, and she kills herself.
In 2012, the first President Barbie was released.
In the 2013 video game Saints Row IV, the fully customizable player character, who becomes the President of the United States after foiling a terrorist attack, can be female.
In 2016, an ad campaign for Elie Tahari called "Madam President" featured Shlomit Malka as a female president of the United States. Tahari intended this campaign to be an endorsement of Hillary Clinton, saying, "We have a choice between a man and a woman, and the woman is smarter and more humble, and I wanted to say I support that."
In 2018, the New York Times published two stories written as if reporting on the 2020 presidential election results, one titled "How Trump Won Re-election in 2020", by Bret Stephens, and one titled "How Trump Lost Re-election in 2020", by David Leonhardt; in both Elizabeth Warren was said to be his opponent in that election. Thus, one of the stories (the one where he lost and she won) was about her becoming the first female president of the United States.
The 2018 video game Detroit: Become Human features a female president of the United States named Christina Warren, who is briefly playable during a press conference segment.
In the 2019 video game Death Stranding, Bridget Strand (portrayed by Lindsay Wagner) is the first female president of the United States, and also the last ever president prior to the Death Stranding event. At her death, her daughter Amelie (using the likeness of a younger Wagner and voiced by Emily O'Brien) is named successor to the presidency.
In the Cyberpunk role-playing game, the former CEO of Militech, Elizabeth Kress, served as president of New United States of America from 2019 to 2069. In the 2020 video game Cyberpunk 2077'', Rosalind Myers, also a former CEO of Militech, is the president.

See also
 African-American presidents of the United States in popular culture
 List of presidents of the United States
 Lists of fictional presidents of the United States

References

Presidential elections in the United States
United States presidency in popular culture
Politics in popular culture
Lists of fictional presidents of the United States
Lists of fictional females